This is a list of State Highways in Telangana State, India.

List

See also

List of National Highways in Telangana
National Highways Development Project

Roads in Telangana
Transport in Telangana
 
Telangana State Highways
State Highways